The Jewish Ghetto Police or Jewish Police Service ( or Jüdischer Ordnungsdienst), also called the Jewish Police by Jews, were auxiliary police units organized within the Nazi ghettos by local Judenrat (Jewish councils).

Overview
Members of the Jewish Police did not usually have official uniforms, often wearing just an identifying armband, a hat, and a badge, and were not allowed to carry firearms, although they did carry batons. In ghettos where the Judenrat was resistant to German orders, the Jewish police were often used (as reportedly in Lutsk) to control or replace the council. One of the largest Jewish police units was to be found in the Warsaw Ghetto, where the Jüdischer Ordnungsdienst numbered about 2,500. The Łódź Ghetto had about 1,200, and the Lwów Ghetto 500.

Anatol Chari, a policeman in the Łodz Ghetto, in his memoirs describes his work protecting food depots, controlling bakery employees, as well as patrols aimed at the confiscation of food from the ghetto residents. He recounts the involvement of Jewish policemen in swindling food rations and in forcing women to provide sexual services in exchange for bread. The Polish-Jewish historian and Warsaw Ghetto archivist Emanuel Ringelblum has described the cruelty of the ghetto Jewish police as "at times greater than that of the Germans, the Ukrainians and the Latvians." The Jewish ghetto police ultimately shared the same fate with all their fellow ghetto inmates. On the ghettos' liquidation (1942–1943), they were either killed on-site or sent to extermination camps.

See also
Kapo
Żagiew
Group 13
Kraków Ghetto Jewish Police

References

Further reading

A Jewish Policeman in Lwow An Early Account, 1941-1943 Ben Z. Redner Translator: Jerzy Michalowicz (2015)

External links

Judischer Ordnungsdienst at Yad Vashem
The Relations between the Judenrat and the Jewish police at Yad Vashem
Ghetto Police at the YIVO Encyclopedia of Jews in Eastern Europe

Police of Nazi Germany
Police forces of Nazi Germany
Jewish collaboration with Nazi Germany
Nazi terminology
Ghettos in Nazi-occupied Europe
Jewish ghettos in Nazi-occupied Poland
1939 establishments in Poland
1943 disestablishments in Poland